Fulwell & Westbury was a railway station in Buckinghamshire that served the village of Westbury and the hamlet of Fulwell in neighbouring Oxfordshire, England. It opened in 1879 London & North Western Railway who had taken over the line from the Buckinghamshire Railway that year. The station consisted of one platform, a ticket office, and two waiting rooms. The station was closed for passengers in 1961 and completely in December 1963.

Routes

References

Sources

External links 
 Image of the station site
 The station station on navigable 1946 O. S. map
 The station on Disused Stations

Disused railway stations in Buckinghamshire
Former London and North Western Railway stations
Railway stations in Great Britain opened in 1879
Railway stations in Great Britain closed in 1963